Iles Frank Wyatt (born 2 December 1946) is a British former sports shooter.

Sport shooting career
Wyatt competed in the 50 metre pistol event at the 1972 Summer Olympics.

He represented England and won a bronze medal in the 50 metres free pistol pair with Geoffrey Robinson, at the 1982 Commonwealth Games in Brisbane, Queensland, Australia. Twenty years later he made a second appearance at the Games when he competed in the 2002 Commonwealth Games in the 50 metres free pistol individual and pair events.

References

1946 births
Living people
British male sport shooters
Olympic shooters of Great Britain
Shooters at the 1972 Summer Olympics
Commonwealth Games medallists in shooting
Commonwealth Games bronze medallists for England
Shooters at the 1982 Commonwealth Games
Shooters at the 2002 Commonwealth Games
Medallists at the 1982 Commonwealth Games